Gabapentin, sold under the brand name Neurontin among others, is an anticonvulsant medication primarily used to treat partial seizures and neuropathic pain. It is a first-line medication for the treatment of neuropathic pain caused by diabetic neuropathy, postherpetic neuralgia, and central pain. It is moderately effective: about 30–40% of those given gabapentin for diabetic neuropathy or postherpetic neuralgia have a meaningful benefit.

Sleepiness and dizziness are the most common side effects. Serious side effects include an increased risk of suicide, respiratory depression, and allergic reactions. Lower doses are recommended in those with kidney disease. Gabapentin acts by decreasing activity of a subset of calcium channels.

Gabapentin was first approved for use in 1993. It has been available as a generic medication in the United States since 2004. In 2020, it was the tenth most commonly prescribed medication in the United States, with more than 49million prescriptions. During the 1990s, Parke-Davis, a subsidiary of Pfizer, used a number of illegal techniques to encourage physicians in the United States to prescribe gabapentin for unapproved uses. They have paid out millions of dollars to settle lawsuits regarding these activities.

Medical uses
Gabapentin is recommended for use in focal seizures and neuropathic pain. Gabapentin is widely prescribed off-label in the US and UK, for example, for the treatment of non-neuropathic pain, anxiety disorders and bipolar disorder. There is concern regarding gabapentin's off-label use due to the lack of strong scientific evidence for its efficacy in multiple conditions and its proven side effects.

Seizures
Gabapentin is approved for the treatment of focal seizures; however, it is not effective for generalized epilepsy.

Neuropathic pain
Gabapentin is recommended as a first-line treatment for chronic neuropathic pain by various medical authorities. This is a general recommendation applicable to all neuropathic pain syndromes except for trigeminal neuralgia.

In regard to the specific diagnoses, the best evidence exists for gabapentin treatment of postherpetic neuralgia and diabetic neuropathy. Gabapentin is approved for the former indication in the US. In addition to these two neuropathies, European Federation of Neurological Societies guideline notes gabapentin effectiveness for central pain. A combination of gabapentin with an opioid or nortriptyline may work better than either drug alone.

Gabapentin shows substantial benefit (at least 50% pain relief or a patient global impression of change (PGIC) "very much improved") for neuropathic pain (postherpetic neuralgia or peripheral diabetic neuropathy) in 30–40% of subjects treated as compared to those treated with placebo.

Evidence finds little or no benefit and significant risk in those with chronic low back pain or sciatica. Gabapentin is not effective in HIV-associated sensory neuropathy and neuropathic pain due to cancer.

Anxiety
There is a small amount of research on the use of gabapentin for the treatment of anxiety disorders.

Gabapentin is effective for the long-term treatment of social anxiety disorder and in reducing preoperative anxiety.

In a controlled trial of breast cancer survivors with anxiety, and in a trial for social phobia, gabapentin significantly reduced anxiety levels. 

For panic disorder, gabapentin has produced mixed results.

Sleep
Gabapentin is effective in treating sleep disorders such as insomnia and restless legs syndrome that are the result of an underlying illness. At the same time it comes with a high risk of discontinuation and withdrawal symptoms. 

Gabapentin enhances slow-wave sleep in patients with primary insomnia. It also improves sleep quality by elevating sleep efficiency and decreasing spontaneous arousal.

Drug dependence
Gabapentin is moderately effective in reducing the symptoms of alcohol withdrawal and associated craving. The evidence in favor of gabapentin is weak in the treatment of alcoholism: it does not contribute to the achievement of abstinence, and the data on the relapse of heavy drinking and percent of days abstinent do not robustly favor gabapentin; it only decreases the percent days of heavy drinking.

Gabapentin is ineffective in cocaine dependence and methamphetamine use, and it does not increase the rate of smoking cessation. Gabapentin does not significantly reduce the symptoms of opiate withdrawal. There is insufficient evidence for its use in cannabis dependence.

Other
Gabapentin is recommended as a first-line treatment of the acquired pendular nystagmus, torsional nystagmus, and infantile nystagmus; however, it does not work in periodic alternating nystagmus.

Gabapentin decreases the frequency of hot flashes in both menopausal women and patients with breast cancer. However, antidepressants have similar efficacy, and treatment with estrogen more effectively prevents hot flashes.

Gabapentin reduces spasticity in multiple sclerosis and is prescribed as one of the first-line options. It is an established treatment of restless legs syndrome. Gabapentin alleviates itching in kidney failure (uremic pruritus) and itching of other causes. It may be an option in essential or orthostatic tremor. Although the efficacy of gabapentin for insomnia has not been established, it does alleviate sleep disorder in patients with medical illness.

Gabapentin does not appear to provide benefit for bipolar disorder, complex regional pain syndrome, post-surgical pain, or tinnitus, or prevent episodic migraine in adults.

Contraindications
Gabapentin should be used carefully and at lower doses in people with kidney problems due to possible accumulation and toxicity. It is unclear if it is safe during pregnancy or breastfeeding.

Side effects
Dizziness and somnolence are the most frequent side effects. Fatigue, ataxia, peripheral edema (swelling of extremities), and nystagmus are also common. Gabapentin is associated with a weight gain of 2.2 kg after 1.5 months of use. Case studies indicate that it may cause anorgasmia and erectile dysfunction, as well as myoclonus that disappear after discontinuing gabapentin or replacing it with other medication. DRESS, anaphylaxis, respiratory depression, and increased suicide behavior are the rare but serious side effects.

Suicide
The gabapentin label contains a warning of an increased risk of suicidal thoughts and behaviors. According to an insurance claims database study, gabapentin use is associated with about 40% increased risk of suicide, suicide attempt and violent death as compared with a reference anticonvulsant drug topiramate. The risk is increased for both bipolar disorder and epilepsy patients. Another study has shown an approximately doubled rate of suicide attempts and self-harm in patients with bipolar disorder who are taking gabapentin versus those taking lithium.
A large Swedish study suggests that gabapentinoids are associated with an increased risk of suicidal behaviour, unintentional overdoses, head/body injuries, and road traffic incidents and offences.

Respiratory depression
Serious breathing suppression, potentially fatal, may occur when gabapentin is taken together with opioids, benzodiazepines, or other depressants, or by people with underlying lung problems such as COPD. Gabapentin and opioids are commonly prescribed or abused together, and research indicates that the breathing suppression they cause is additive. For example, gabapentin use before joint replacement or laparoscopic surgery increased the risk of respiratory depression by 30–60%.

Withdrawal and dependence
Withdrawal symptoms typically occur 1–2 days after abruptly stopping gabapentin. Agitation, confusion and disorientation are the most frequently reported, followed by gastrointestinal complaints and sweating, and more rare tremor, tachycardia, hypertension and insomnia. In some cases, users experience withdrawal seizures. All these symptoms subside when gabapentin is re-instated.

On its own, gabapentin appears to not have a substantial addictive power. In human and animal experiments, it shows limited to no rewarding effects. The vast majority of people abusing gabapentin are current or former abusers of opioids or sedatives. In these persons, gabapentin can boost the opioid "high" as well as decrease commonly experienced opioid-withdrawal symptoms such as anxiety.

Overdose
Through excessive ingestion, accidental or otherwise, persons may experience overdose symptoms including drowsiness, sedation, blurred vision, slurred speech, somnolence, uncontrollable jerking motions, and anxiety. A very high amount taken is associated with breathing suppression, coma, and possibly death, particularly if combined with alcohol or opioids.

Pharmacology

Pharmacodynamics
Gabapentin is a ligand of the α2δ calcium channel subunit. α2δ is an auxiliary protein connected to the main α1 subunit (the channel-forming protein) of high voltage activated voltage-dependent calcium channels (L-type, N-type, P/Q type, and R-type). Gabapentin is not a direct channel blocker: it exerts its actions by disrupting the regulatory function of α2δ and its interactions with other proteins. Gabapentin prevents delivery of the calcium channels to the cell membrane, reduces the activation of the channels by the α2δ subunit, decreases signaling leading to neurotransmitters release, and disrupts interactions of α2δ with NMDA receptors, neurexins, and thrombospondins. Out of the four known isoforms of α2δ protein, gabapentin binds with similar high affinity to two: α2δ-1 and α2δ-2. Most of the pharmacological properties of gabapentin are explained by its binding to just one isoform – α2δ-1.

The endogenous α-amino acids L-leucine and L-isoleucine, which resemble gabapentin in chemical structure, bind α2δ with similar affinity to gabapentin and are present in human cerebrospinal fluid at micromolar concentrations. They may be the endogenous ligands of the α2δ subunit, and they competitively antagonize the effects of gabapentin. Accordingly, while gabapentin has nanomolar affinity for the α2δ subunit, its potency in vivo is in the low micromolar range, and competition for binding by endogenous L-amino acids is likely to be responsible for this discrepancy.

Gabapentin is a potent activator of voltage-gated potassium channels KCNQ3 and KCNQ5, even at low nanomolar concentrations. However, this activation is unlikely to be the dominant mechanism of gabapentin's therapeutic effects.

Despite the fact that gabapentin is a structural GABA analogue, and in spite of its name, it does not bind to the GABA receptors, does not convert into  or another GABA receptor agonist in vivo, and does not modulate GABA transport or metabolism.

Pharmacokinetics
Gabapentin is absorbed from the intestines by an active transport process mediated via an amino acid transporter, presumably, LAT2. As a result, the pharmacokinetics of gabapentin is dose-dependent, with diminished bioavailability and delayed peak levels at higher doses.

The oral bioavailability of gabapentin is approximately 80% at 100 mg administered three times daily once every 8 hours, but decreases to 60% at 300 mg, 47% at 400 mg, 34% at 800 mg, 33% at 1,200 mg, and 27% at 1,600 mg, all with the same dosing schedule. Drugs that increase the transit time of gabapentin in the small intestine can increase its oral bioavailability; when gabapentin was co-administered with oral morphine, the oral bioavailability of a 600 mg dose of gabapentin increased by 50%.

Gabapentin at a low dose of 100 mg has a Tmax (time to peak levels) of approximately 1.7 hours, while the Tmax increases to 3 to 4 hours at higher doses. Food does not significantly affect the Tmax of gabapentin and increases the Cmax and area-under-curve levels of gabapentin by approximately 10%.

Gabapentin can cross the blood–brain barrier and enter the central nervous system. Gabapentin concentration in cerebrospinal fluid is approximately 9–14% of its blood plasma concentration. Due to its low lipophilicity, gabapentin requires active transport across the blood–brain barrier. The LAT1 is highly expressed at the blood–brain barrier and transports gabapentin across into the brain. As with intestinal absorption mediated by an amino acid transporter, the transport of gabapentin across the blood–brain barrier by LAT1 is saturable. Gabapentin does not bind to other drug transporters such as P-glycoprotein (ABCB1) or OCTN2 (SLC22A5). It is not significantly bound to plasma proteins (<1%).

Gabapentin undergoes little or no metabolism.

Gabapentin is eliminated renally in the urine. It has a relatively short elimination half-life, with the reported average value of 5 to 7 hours. This value changes with increasing doses, from 5.4 hours for a 200 mg single dose, to 8.3 hours for a 1,400 mg dose. Because of its short elimination half-life, gabapentin must be administered 3 to 4 times per day to maintain therapeutic levels. Gabapentin XR (brand name Gralise) is taken once a day.

Chemistry

Gabapentin is a 3,3-disubstituted derivative of GABA. Therefore, it is a GABA analogue, as well as a γ-amino acid. Specifically, it is a derivative of GABA with a pentyl disubstitution at 3 position, hence, the name - gabapentin, in such a way as to form a six-membered ring. After formation of the ring, the amine and carboxylic groups are not in the same relative positions as they are in the GABA; they are more conformationally constrained.

Synthesis

A chemical synthesis of gabapentin has been described starting from 1,1-diacetyl hexane anhydride.

History
Gabapentin was designed by researchers at Parke-Davis to be an analogue of the neurotransmitter GABA that could more easily cross the blood–brain barrier and was first described in 1975 by Satzinger and Hartenstein. Under the brand name Neurontin, it was first approved in May 1993, for the treatment of epilepsy in the United Kingdom. Approval by the U.S. Food and Drug Administration followed in December 1993, for use as an adjuvant (effective when added to other antiseizure drugs) medication to control partial seizures in adults; that indication was extended to children in 2000. Subsequently, gabapentin was approved in the United States for the treatment of postherpetic neuralgia in 2002. A generic version of gabapentin first became available in the United States in 2004. An extended-release formulation of gabapentin for once-daily administration, under the brand name Gralise, was approved in the United States for the treatment postherpetic neuralgia in January 2011.

Society and culture

Legal status

United Kingdom
Effective April 2019, the United Kingdom reclassified the drug as a class C controlled substance.

United States
Effective 1 July 2017, Kentucky classified gabapentin as a schedule V controlled substance statewide. Effective 9 January 2019, Michigan also classified gabapentin as a schedule V controlled substance. Gabapentin is scheduled V drug in other states such as West Virginia, Tennessee, Alabama.

Off-label promotion
Although some small, non-controlled studies in the 1990s—mostly sponsored by gabapentin's manufacturer—suggested that treatment for bipolar disorder with gabapentin may be promising, the preponderance of evidence suggests that it is not effective. Subsequent to the corporate acquisition of the original patent holder, the pharmaceutical company Pfizer admitted that there had been violations of FDA guidelines regarding the promotion of unproven off-label uses for gabapentin in the Franklin v. Parke-Davis case (see below).

Reuters reported on 25 March 2010, that "Pfizer Inc violated federal racketeering law by improperly promoting the epilepsy drug Neurontin ... Under federal RICO law the penalty is automatically tripled, so the finding will cost Pfizer $141 million." The case stems from a claim from Kaiser Foundation Health Plan Inc. that "it was misled into believing Neurontin was effective for off-label treatment of migraines, bipolar disorder and other conditions. Pfizer argued that Kaiser physicians still recommend the drug for those uses", and that "the insurer's website also still lists Neurontin as a drug for neuropathic pain."

The Wall Street Journal noted that Pfizer spokesman Christopher Loder said, "We are disappointed with the verdict and will pursue post-trial motions and an appeal." He later added that "the verdict and the judge's rulings are not consistent with the facts and the law."

Franklin v. Parke-Davis case

While off-label prescriptions are common for a number of drugs, marketing of off-label uses of a drug is not. In 2004, Warner-Lambert (which subsequently was acquired by Pfizer) agreed to plead guilty for activities of its Parke-Davis subsidiary, and to pay $430 million in fines to settle civil and criminal charges regarding the marketing of Neurontin for off-label purposes. The 2004 settlement was one of the largest in U.S. history, and the first off-label promotion case brought successfully under the False Claims Act.

Brand names
Gabapentin was originally marketed under the brand name Neurontin. Since it became generic, it has been marketed worldwide using over 300 different brand names. An extended-release formulation of gabapentin for once-daily administration was introduced in 2011, for postherpetic neuralgia under the brand name Gralise.

Related drugs
Parke-Davis developed a drug called pregabalin, which is related in structure to gabapentin, as a successor to gabapentin. Another similar drug atagabalin has been unsuccessfully tried by Pfizer as a treatment for insomnia. A prodrug form (gabapentin enacarbil) was approved by the U.S. Food and Drug Administration (FDA).

Recreational use
Gabapentin when taken in excess can induce euphoria, a sense of calm, a marijuana-like high, improved sociability, and reduced alcohol or cocaine cravings. Also known on the streets as "Gabbies", gabapentin is increasingly abused and misused for these euphoric effects. About 1 percent of the responders to an Internet poll and 22 percent of those attending addiction facilities had a history of abuse of gabapentin. Gabapentin misuse, toxicity, and use in suicide attempts among adults in the US increased from 2013 to 2017.

After Kentucky's implementation of stricter legislation regarding opioid prescriptions in 2012, there was an increase in gabapentin-only and multi-drug use in 2012–2015. The majority of these cases were from overdose in suspected suicide attempts. These rates were also accompanied by increases in abuse and recreational use.

Withdrawal symptoms, often resembling those of benzodiazepine withdrawal, play a role in the physical dependence some users experience. Its misuse predominantly coincides with the usage of other CNS depressant drugs, namely opioids, benzodiazepines, and alcohol.

Veterinary use
In cats, gabapentin can be used as an analgesic in multi-modal pain management, anxiety medication to reduce stress in cats for travel or vet visits, and anticonvulsant. Veterinarians may prescribe gabapentin as an anticonvulsant and pain reliever in dogs. It is also used to treat chronic pain-associated nerve inflammation in horses and dogs. Side effects include tiredness and loss of coordination.

References

External links 

 

Amino acids
Analgesics
Anticonvulsants
Anxiolytics
Calcium channel blockers
GABA analogues
Pfizer brands
Wikipedia medicine articles ready to translate